Back on My Buck Shit Vol. 2: Change of Plans is a mixtape by rapper Young Buck, Hosted by Drumma Boy. The mixtape features exclusive tracks and freestyles from Young Buck with appearances by The Game, The Outlawz, Lupe Fiasco, and more. It was released for digital download on Halloween October 31, 2010. The mixtape is Vol. 2 of a so far of a three volume release. However instead of DJ Smallz and DJ Scream, Vol. 2 is hosted & produced by Drumma Boy. On mixtape website DatPiff, it has been certified Silver for being downloaded over 50,000 times.

Background
Due to contract issues with G-Unit Records and a feud with label head 50 Cent, Young Buck could not release a new album. So with help from Drumma Boy and Drum Squad Records, Buck got together and they released an official mixtape for the streets through Young Buck's record label Ca$hville Records and Drumma Boy's label Drum Squad Records. The mixtape sold 70,000 copies in the first week of its release. As of 2011 it has sold up to 500,000 copies, which was certified gold record sales.

Track list

References

External links 
 
 
 

2010 mixtape albums
Young Buck albums
Albums produced by Drumma Boy